Mohsin Bhopali (born 1932 - 17 January 2007) was a Pakistani poet. He was known for a travelogue Hairaton ki Sarzamin and a book of verses Shahr-i-Ashob in opposition to  the 1992 military operation in Karachi.

References

2007 deaths
1932 births
Pakistani poets
Urdu-language poets from Pakistan
People from Bhopal
Muhajir people